Pearl City is a small unincorporated community in DeWitt County, Texas, United States, at the intersection of State Highway 111 and Farm Road 951 just west of Yoakum and 191 miles west of Houston.

History
The community was named after the Pearl Brewing Company's Pearl beer.

References

External links

Profile of Pearl City from the Handbook of Texas Online
Pearl City profile on Placenames.com

Unincorporated communities in DeWitt County, Texas
Unincorporated communities in Texas